|}

The Prix Kergorlay is a Group 2 flat horse race in France open to thoroughbreds aged three years or older. It is run at Deauville over a distance of 3,000 metres (about 1⅞ miles), and it is scheduled to take place each year in August.

History
The event was established in 1864, and it was originally called the Prix de la Société d'Encouragement. It was named after the Société d'Encouragement, a governing body of horse racing in France. The inaugural running was part of Deauville's first ever race meeting, and the prize money for the winning owner was 5,100 francs. In its early years the event was contested over 3,000 metres. It was cancelled because of the Franco-Prussian War in 1871.

The race became known as the Prix de Longchamps in 1875. It was cut to 2,800 metres in 1889, and to 2,600 metres in 1896. It was extended to 3,400 metres in 1907.

It was renamed in memory of Florian de Kergorlay (died October 1910), a former chairman of the Société des Courses de Deauville, in 1911. The Prix Florian de Kergorlay was abandoned throughout World War I, and it returned with a distance of 3,000 metres in 1919.

The title of the race was shortened to the Prix Kergorlay in 1929. It was cancelled twice during World War II, in 1940 and 1941. The event's usual venue was closed during this period, so it was staged temporarily at Le Tremblay (1942–43) and Longchamp (1944–45).

Records
Most successful horse (2 wins):
 Fourire – 1899, 1900
 Sea Sick – 1909, 1910
 La Francaise – 1911, 1912
 Ardan – 1945, 1946
 Celadon – 1963, 1965
 Marmelo – 2017, 2019

Leading jockey (4 wins):
 Arthur Watkins – Vertugadin (1866), Ruy Blas (1867), Dutch Tar (1868), L'Aspirant (1870)
 George Stern – Saxon (1901), Genial (1905), Sauge Pourpree (1908), Grillemont (1923)
 Jacques Doyasbère – Marsyas (1944), Ardan (1945, 1946), Lavarede (1951)
 Maurice Philipperon – Waylay (1966), Homeric (1972), Valuta (1973), Tipperary Fixer (1981)
 Cash Asmussen – King Luthier (1986), Top Sunrise (1989), Turgeon (1991), Sought Out (1992)
 Olivier Peslier – Molesnes (1994), Ponte Tresa (2008), Alex My Boy (2015),  Call The Wind (2020)

Leading trainer (9 wins):
 Henry Jennings – Ruy Blas (1867), Dutch Tar (1868), L'Aspirant (1870), Revigny (1873), Montargis (1874), Basquine (1876), Giboulee (1877), Mourle (1879), Arbitre (1880)

Leading owner (6 wins):
 Alexandre Aumont – Revigny (1873), Basquine (1876), Mademoiselle de Senlis (1883), Siberie (1888), Nativa (1890), Floreal (1891)

Winners since 1980

Earlier winners

 1864: Nobility
 1865: La Reine Berthe
 1866: Vertugadin
 1867: Ruy Blas
 1868: Dutch Tar
 1869: Clotho
 1870: L'Aspirant
 1871: no race
 1872: Bivouac
 1873: Revigny
 1874: Montargis
 1875: Nougat
 1876: Basquine
 1877: Giboulee
 1878: Gift
 1879: Mourle
 1880: Arbitre
 1881: Castillon
 1882: Aquilin
 1883: Mademoiselle de Senlis
 1884: Escogriffe
 1885: Cafe Procope / Vicq *
 1886: Fripon
 1887: Brisolier
 1888: Siberie
 1889: Prix Fixe
 1890: Nativa
 1891: Floreal
 1892: Galette
 1893: Boissiere
 1894:
 1895: Lutin
 1896: Le Sagittaire
 1897: Riposte
 1898: Hawamdieh
 1899: Fourire
 1900: Fourire
 1901: Saxon
 1902: Maximum
 1903: Ex Voto
 1904: Turenne
 1905: Genial
 1906: Maintenon
 1907: Punta Gorda
 1908: Sauge Pourpree
 1909: Sea Sick
 1910: Sea Sick
 1911: La Francaise
 1912: La Francaise
 1913: Predicateur
 1914–18: no race
 1919: Tullamore
 1920: Juveigneur
 1921: Nouvel An
 1922: Keror
 1923: Grillemont
 1924: Isola Bella
 1925: Dark Diamond
 1926: Asteroide
 1927: Sou du Franc
 1928: Bois Josselyn
 1929: Innoxa
 1930: Trie Chateau
 1931: Deiri
 1932: Fog Horn
 1933: La Souriciere
 1934: Dark Dew
 1935: Prince Achille
 1936: Le Vizir
 1937: Khasnadar
 1938: Molitor
 1939: Premier Baiser
 1940–41: no race
 1942: Vigilance
 1943: Verso II
 1944: Marsyas
 1945: Ardan
 1946: Ardan
 1947: Souverain
 1948: Bey
 1949: Espace Vital
 1950: Ciel Etoile
 1951: Lavarede
 1952: Fast Fox
 1953: Silex
 1954: Elu
 1955: Macip
 1956: Pont Levis
 1957: Romantisme
 1958: Achaz
 1959: Vieux Chateau
 1960: Grand Schelem
 1961: Gisors
 1962: Bounteous
 1963: Celadon
 1964: Ashavan
 1965: Celadon
 1966: Waylay
 1967: Mehari
 1968: Pardallo
 1969: Pandora Bay
 1970: Reindeer
 1971: Miss Dan
 1972: Homeric
 1973: Valuta
 1974: Ribecourt
 1975: Moss Trooper
 1976: Citoyen
 1977: Solaro
 1978: Shafaraz
 1979: Campero

* The 1885 race was a dead-heat and has joint winners.

See also
 List of French flat horse races
 Recurring sporting events established in 1864  – this race is included under its original title, Prix de la Société d'Encouragement.

References

 France Galop / Racing Post:
 galop.courses-france.com:
 1864–1889, 1890–1919, 1920–1949, 1950–1979, 1980–present

 france-galop.com – A Brief History: Prix Kergorlay.
 galopp-sieger.de – Prix Kergorlay (ex Prix de Longchamps).
 horseracingintfed.com – International Federation of Horseracing Authorities – Prix Kergorlay (2018).
 pedigreequery.com – Prix Kergorlay – Deauville.

Open long distance horse races
Deauville-La Touques Racecourse
Horse races in France
Recurring sporting events established in 1864
1864 establishments in France